Ricardo Marín may refer to:

 Ricardo Marín (footballer) (born 1998), Mexican footballer 
 Ricardo Marín (handballer) (born 1968), Spanish handball player